John Dowell Brown (25 August 1890 – 18 March 1968) was an English cricketer.  Brown was a left-handed batsman who bowled slow left-arm orthodox.  He was born at Coventry, Warwickshire.

Brown made his first-class debut for Warwickshire against Worcestershire at Tipton Road, Dudley in the 1913 County Championship.  He made eight further first-class appearances for the county, the last of which came against Sussex in the 1914 County Championship.  In his nine first-class matches, he took 9 wickets at a bowling average of 29.33, with best figures of 4/18.  With the bat, he scored 12 runs at an average of 1.71, with a high score of 7.

He died at Leamington Spa, Warwickshire on 18 March 1968.

References

External links
 John Brown at ESPNcricinfo
 John Brown at CricketArchive

1890 births
1968 deaths
Cricketers from Coventry
English cricketers
Warwickshire cricketers